Jodie Nash is a fictional character from the British Channel 4 soap opera Hollyoaks, played by Kate McEnery between 2001 and 2003.

Storylines
Jodie arrived in Hollyoaks with best friend Nick O'Connor (Darren Bransford) and brother Jamie Nash (Stefan Booth), Jodie came across to many as a tomboy. She liked to do many things that boys had liked to do, and yet her best friend Nick was the opposite and was gay. Jodie had a love/hate relationship with Jamie, whilst with Nick she formed a special bond of friendship.

Immediately, she became the famous 'virgin' of Hollyoaks, as her love life was a disaster. She began to date with Max Cunningham (Matt Littler) but nothing further had developed. However, things turned for the worse for Jodie, when her brother Jamie died in an accident during a potholing trip. Jodie failed to cope with this news and despite help from Nick, Jodie was confused which led to her sleeping with Nick. Confused about her feelings and Nick puzzled about his sexuality, Jodie decided to take a break away from Hollyoaks to clear her head out.

She returned in spectacular style as she had re-invented herself as a far more assertive and flirtatious woman. She decided to remain good friends with Nick, who had problems with his sexuality, and her love life had an improvement. She began to have one night stands, with Max and Jake Dean (Kevin Sacre). However, neither of them really worked out for Jodie as she set her sights on the unexpected. She began a relationship with her flatmate Kristian Hargreaves (Max Brown), but Jodie's life was destined not to be in Hollyoaks. After discovering that she had failed her course, Jodie had to leave the village and said her farewell goodbye to best friend Nick, as she returned home.

Hollyoaks characters
Female characters in television
Television characters introduced in 2001